Celestial Tiger Entertainment (CTE), formerly Tiger Gate Entertainment, is a diversified media company based in Hong Kong that operates pay television entertainment channels in Asia and oversees Lionsgate distribution rights in Greater China and Southeast Asia. It is a joint venture co-owned by Saban Capital Group, Lionsgate and Celestial Pictures.

Overview
Celestial Tiger Entertainment was founded in 2008 as Tiger Gate Entertainment, as a joint venture between private media investment firm Saban Capital Group and entertainment company Lionsgate. Pay television channels Kix and Thrill were later launched in August 2009.

Celestial Pictures Limited joined Tiger Gate Entertainment in late 2011 adding the already established Celestial Classic Movies and Celestial Movies to the company's channel lineup. Following this partnership, the company was renamed Celestial Tiger Entertainment and the high definition (HD) feed was added to existing channels for territories in Asia.

In 2013, cHK was launched in Singapore with Hong Kong celebrities Bernice Liu, Him Law and Liu Kai Chi hosting a media event to promote cHK as a Hong Kong general entertainment channel.

Lionsgate partnership
CTE owns the Shaw Brothers film library and leverages a library of film and TV from Lionsgate. In February 2012, YOU On Demand Holdings and Lionsgate announced deal to show a number of Lionsgate films on a Transactional Video On Demand (TVOD) and Subscription Video On Demand (SVOD) basis in China. In 2013, CTE sold over 1700 hours of Lionsgate TV series and movies including Anger Management, The Twilight Saga: Breaking Dawn – Part 2, and the Hunger Games franchise to broadcasters and media platforms in southeast Asia and China as part of a regional distribution deal, CTE also expanded its Southeast Asian distribution deal with Lionsgate to cover Japan and Korea and sold a further 700 hours of TV series and feature films in an SVOD deal with MediaCorp’s Toggle digital platform in Singapore.

Channels
Celestial Tiger Entertainment operates the following channels:
Celestial Movies - A channel featuring current Asian films and entertainment news 
 Available in Malaysia, Brunei, South Korea, Indonesia, Philippines, and Singapore
Celestial Movies HD - A channel featuring current Asian films and entertainment news in HD. 
 Available in Singapore, Malaysia, Brunei, and Indonesia.
Celestial Classic Movies* -  Featuring classic Hong Kong Chinese films
 Available in Australia, Myanmar, Taiwan (OTT Only),  Cambodia, Hong Kong, Indonesia, Philippines, Singapore, Thailand, Malaysia, and Brunei.
Celestial Movies Pinoy** - Filipino and English dubbed Asian movie channel distributed and marketed by Viva Communications.
Available only in the Philippines via Cignal TV Channel 40 SD.
cHK - Local Hong Kong entertainment and showbiz news channel 
 Available in Singapore and coming soon to Philippines, Malaysia, and Brunei.
CM+ - Featuring the latest blockbusters and exclusive movies from across Asia
Available only in Singapore via Singtel TV Channel 571.
Kix* - Action, MMA, TV series, reality television and extreme sports
 Available in Hong Kong, Indonesia, Malaysia, Philippines, Thailand and  Singapore, Myanmar, Vietnam. From October 2020, this channel is launched across Africa
Thrill* - Horror, thriller and suspense
 Available in Hong Kong, Indonesia, Philippines, Singapore, Thailand, Myanmar and coming soon to Malaysia and Brunei.
Miao Mi* - Mandarin Kids Channel.
 Available in Indonesia, Philippines, Thailand, South Korea, Singapore (OTT Only), Malaysia (OTT Only)

* Distributed in the Philippines by Creative Programs
**  Joint Venture with Viva Communications

References

External links 
 

Mass media companies of Hong Kong
Mass media companies established in 2008
Joint ventures
Lionsgate subsidiaries